The Tenth Planet is the partly missing second serial of the fourth season in the British science fiction television series Doctor Who, which was first broadcast in four weekly parts from 8 to 29 October 1966. It was William Hartnell's last regular appearance as the First Doctor, and the first story to feature the process later termed regeneration, whereby the lead character, The Doctor, undergoes a transformation into a new physical form. Patrick Troughton makes his first, uncredited appearance as the Second Doctor.

The serial is also notable as the first story to feature the Cybermen, a race of malevolent cyborgs that became a recurring adversary in later Doctor Who stories. The "tenth planet" in the title makes reference to a fictional lost planet in Earth's Solar System; at the time of production, the Solar System was generally held to consist of nine planets, prior to the redesignation of Pluto as a minor planet.

The Tenth Planet is an incomplete Doctor Who serial – one of many serials that were affected by the BBC's policy of wiping archived programmes in the 1960s and 1970s. Only three of the four episodes are currently held in the BBC archives; the last episode remains missing, although several short clips, including the regeneration sequence, have been discovered intact. In 2013, The Tenth Planet was released on DVD with a full-length animated reconstruction of its missing footage.

Plot

The Doctor and his companions Ben and Polly arrive in the TARDIS at the South Pole in the year 1986. They find themselves in the Snowcap Base, a space tracking station commanded by General Cutler. The base is supervising the mission of the Zeus IV spaceship, running a routine probe on the Earth's atmosphere. The spaceship is drawn off-course by an unknown force, and Snowcap monitoring staff discover a new, unknown planet approaching Earth. Recognising identical landmasses to those of Earth, the Doctor reveals that this is Mondas, the Earth's long-lost twin planet, and that its inhabitants will soon be visiting Earth.

A mysterious spaceship lands in the snow and three robotic creatures emerge, kill the guards and infiltrate Snowcap Base, taking control. They reveal that they are Cybermen, a race who, though once like human beings, have gradually replaced their bodies with mechanical parts, and eliminated the "weakness" of emotion from their brains. The Cybermen prevent the base staff from saving the Zeus IV, and it is destroyed by the gravitational pull of Mondas. The emotionless Cybermen state that the lives of the crew are irrelevant to them. The Cybermen explain that Mondas is absorbing energy from Earth and will soon destroy it. They propose to take humans back to Mondas and turn them into Cybermen.

General Cutler, the Snowcap base personnel and the Doctor's companions mount a resistance to the Cybermen, overpowering them and killing them with their own cyberweapons. Cutler plans to destroy Mondas using a Z-bomb, one of a series of powerful nuclear bombs that are placed at strategic points around the world, and contacts Space Command HQ in Geneva. The chief scientist Dr. Barclay expresses concerns that the radiation caused by the exploding planet would cause immense loss of life on Earth, and Ben argues that Mondas might destroy itself anyway when it absorbs too much energy. Suddenly, the Doctor passes out, ill. Faced with dissent, Cutler orders Ben to be imprisoned in a cabin with the Doctor. Ben escapes and, with the help of Polly and Barclay, sabotages the Z-bomb rocket. Cutler attempts to fire the Z-bomb, but the engines fail on the launchpad. As Cutler threatens to kill Ben, Barclay, and the Doctor, who has now regained consciousness, he is killed by a new squadron of Cybermen. The Doctor, who explains to Polly his body is “wearing a bit thin”, and realising that Mondas is approaching destruction, attempts to mediate with the Cybermen, offering them a home on Earth. The Cybermen take Polly and the Doctor back to their spaceship as hostages.

As the Cybermen take over Space Command in Geneva, the Doctor realises that their plan is to destroy the Earth with the remaining Z-bombs, thus saving Mondas. The Cybermen order the humans to disarm the Z-bomb and send Ben, Barclay, Haines and Dyson into the bomb chamber. Ben surmises that the reason the Cybermen send humans to do this work is that the Cybermen are highly susceptible to radiation. Using radioactive rods from the reactor chamber as a weapon against the Cybermen, Ben and the crew regain control of the base. Just as more Cybermen enter the Tracking Room, Mondas explodes. Disconnected from their power source on Mondas, all the remaining Cybermen die. Geneva Space Command contacts the base to announce that the Cyberman threat has ended. Ben frees the Doctor and Polly from the Cybermen's spaceship. The Doctor, who uncharacteristically has lost his sense of humour, says “it’s far from being all over” and abruptly departs for the TARDIS. Though weak, the Doctor gathers enough energy to rescue Polly and Ben. He collapses and transforms into a younger man.

Production
All four episodes of this story feature a specially designed graphics sequence used for the opening titles and closing credits. Designed by Bernard Lodge, they were intended to resemble a computer printout. In the opening credits of the first episode, Kit Pedler is incorrectly identified as "Kitt Pedler". In the opening credits of the third episode, Gerry Davis is incorrectly identified as "Gerry Davies".

William Hartnell did not appear in the third episode. On the Monday before the programme was due to be recorded, he sent a telegram to the production team informing them that he was too ill to work. Gerry Davis rewrote the script to explain the Doctor's absence (his sudden collapse) and gave his dialogue to other characters, most noticeably Ben. This was not as much of an interruption to the episode's production as it would seem, as all four episodes had been written so that Hartnell would have relatively little to do in case of just such an event. The original draft of episode 4 did not feature the Doctor regenerating at the end.

The First Doctor's last words were originally scripted as something similar to "No... no, I simply will not give in!" Time was running short towards the end of production, and director Derek Martinus opted not to record the line, wanting to ensure that the regeneration sequence was recorded as well as possible. As a result, the First Doctor's last words were simply "Ah! Yes. Thank you. That's good, keep warm." The line cut from the script by Martinus suggested that the Doctor was refusing to give in to the regeneration process. In 2017, Doctor Who writer Steven Moffat exploited this idea and created an extended narrative around the Doctor delaying his regeneration for the episode "Twice Upon a Time". The episode uses original footage from The Tenth Planet alongside new scenes with David Bradley replacing William Hartnell, in which the First Doctor meets his future self, the Twelfth Doctor, played by Peter Capaldi.

Cast notes
During the regeneration sequence at the end of the final episode, Patrick Troughton momentarily makes an appearance – uncredited – as the Second Doctor. Although this was William Hartnell's last regular appearance as the First Doctor, he would reprise the role for the tenth anniversary serial The Three Doctors.

As a result of his role as the astronaut Williams in this serial, the Bermudian-born Earl Cameron (who was 49 at the time of filming) reportedly became the first black actor ever to play an astronaut on television. He was also only the third actor from the series to reach 100 years of age, doing so in 2017. He died in 2020 at the age of 102, and although this was his only appearance in Doctor Who, he had a long and varied acting career both before and after this role.

Missing episode
The last episode of this serial is missing. It is one of the most sought-after of the missing episodes, because it contains the historic first regeneration scene (even though a low-quality, truncated copy of this sequence survives and is held in the BBC Archives), and also because it is William Hartnell's final episode. As such, it is included in a list of the twenty most wanted missing programmes (as drawn up by the British National Film Theatre) alongside the BBC studio footage from the Apollo 11 landings (which is currently held only in soundtrack form).

Popular myth has it that the only surviving telerecording copy of the fourth episode was lost when loaned out to the children's programme Blue Peter in 1973 when they wished to use a clip from it in a feature on the tenth anniversary of Doctor Who. Although a print of The Daleks' Master Plan Episode 4 ("The Traitors") was loaned to Blue Peter and not returned to the BBC Film Library, there was never a copy of The Tenth Planet Episode 4 there to have been loaned. Another department – BBC Enterprises – was still offering all four episodes for sale to foreign broadcasters until the end of the following year and would not, in any case, have loaned out master negatives.

In 1992, a man named Roger K. Barrett (later revealed to be an alias, based on the real name of Syd Barrett) claimed to have a videotape recording of Episode 4 of this story, and offered to sell it to the BBC for £500. Before this was revealed as a hoax, the BBC produced a special introduction for an intended VHS release of the story, hosted by Michael Craze, two versions of which were filmed: one explaining that Episode 4 was still missing, the other introducing the story as if it were complete. A documentary called Missing in Action, made in 1993 and narrated by Nicholas Courtney, also mentions the hoax.

In 2000, BBC Video released the story on VHS, with episode four reconstructed by the Doctor Who Restoration Team using still photos, existing clips and the surviving audio soundtrack. For the 2013 DVD release, episode 4 was animated by Planet 55 Studios.

Broadcast and reception

 Episode is missing

In 2009, Patrick Mulkern of Radio Times found the original Cybermen design like "usherettes from some kinky, futuristic moviehouse", but praised the character of Cutler and Hartnell's Doctor. Den of Geek named the cliffhanger of Episode 4 as one of the programme's ten "classic" cliffhangers. Alasdair Wilkins of io9 described it as "a very solid, at times excellent story" and noted "The Cybermen have possibly been more intimidating in other stories, but they have never been creepier than they are here". He named it the fourth best regeneration and regeneration story. DVD Talk's John Sinnott gave the story four and a half out of five stars. He praised Hartnell's performance and the Cybermen. Ian Berriman of SFX was more mixed, giving the serial three out of five stars. He praised the Cybermen and the "palpable tension", but felt that the regeneration was tacked on and not enough background was given to make Mondas believable.

Analysis

The Cybermen were conceived for The Tenth Planet by scientist and writer Kit Pedler and screenwriter Gerry Davis as a depiction of the ultimate outcome of biomechatronic and prosthetic technology in medical science. The writer John Kenneth Muir has noted that Pedler and Davis had previously written about dystopian scientific themes, and would later collaborate on Doomwatch, a speculative fiction BBC TV drama series. Muir suggests that the concept of the Cybermen may have been the inspiration behind a later popular science-fiction cyborg race, the Borg, which first featured in Star Trek: The Next Generation ("Q Who") in 1989.

The writer Kevin S. Decker has evaluated the role of the Cybermen introduced in The Tenth Planet in terms of the traditions of continental philosophy, and considers that they have been deliberately crafted by Davis and Pedler to symbolise the Others in opposition to the human race. Decker states that this sense of Otherness is achieved by Pedler's focus on the theme of "dehumanising medicine" by presenting a race of humans who have replaced most of their flesh and organs with cybernetic parts. Decker also observes that The Tenth Planet plot is based on the "base under siege" scenario, a popular science-fiction device that has been reused in many subsequent Doctor Who stories, and that this serves as a metaphor for evil.

Graham Sleight notes that The Tenth Planet was produced at a time when modern medicine was pioneering transplant surgery, lending a sense of topicality to Davis and Pedler's concept for malevolent cyborgs. He also finds contemporary significance with the 1960s rocket programmes, and notes that the multinational makeup of the Antarctic base crew is particularly noteworthy, having no precedent in earlier Doctor Who stories. However, he is disappointed by the overall execution of The Tenth Planet serial, finding the Cybermen "dull, stereotyped villains" and the portrayal of the Antarctic base staff dependent on "national stereotypes".

The introduction of the concept of regeneration in The Tenth Planet is noted as a landmark in the show's history, and it has been credited with establishing the longevity of the television series by ensuring the survival of the character of The Doctor. Accounts differ as to the reason for Hartnell's departure from the programme; the actor's poor health is often cited, while other claims state that he was dissatisfied with the increasingly "adult" nature of the programme's scripts. Regardless of Hartnell's reasons to quit, Muir notes that while Hartnell's departure initially created a serious problem for the production team, they took the opportunity to create "an elegant, inspired solution to a casting problem" that has endured in the programme's folklore.

Commercial releases

In print

A novelisation of this serial, written by Gerry Davis, was published by Target Books in February 1976. It was the first Hartnell-era serial novelisation to be commissioned by Target, and the first new adaptation of a Hartnell adventure to be published in nearly ten years.

The novelisation largely follows the original script, but places the action in the year 2000 rather than 1986, as well as restoring the Doctor to the third episode. Also, in the first scene in which the Doctor, Ben and Polly appear (in the TARDIS), the Doctor is beginning to show signs of his failing health; sometimes mistakenly addressing Ben and Polly as "Ian" and "Barbara", thereby revealing signs that all is not as it should be. Also, the regeneration of the Doctor occurs in the TARDIS differently. The Doctor uses what appears to be a rejuvenation chamber that assists him in his regeneration.

Home media
The story was released on VHS in the UK in 2000 from BBC Video, with the fourth episode reconstructed by the Doctor Who Restoration Team using still photos, existing clips and the surviving audio soundtrack. This release was a double-tape set entitled "Doctor Who: The Cybermen Box Set: The Tenth Planet and Attack of the Cybermen". In the U.S. and Canada both stories were released individually in 2001. The existing clips from the missing final episode – 8 mm film recordings made by an unknown Australian fan, and a 16mm film clip of the regeneration (from a 1973 edition of Blue Peter) – were included in the DVD release Lost in Time in 2004. The only surviving clip of the regeneration was also released as a special feature on the DVD releases for The Three Doctors and Castrovalva.

The story was individually released on DVD on 14 October 2013, with the missing fourth episode animated along with additional extra features, including the original reconstruction of episode four from the 2000 VHS release, and a special documentary, Frozen Out, on the making of the story. The serial, along with the newly-animated fourth episode, is also contained on the "Regenerations" box set, released on 24 June 2013.

Music release

The soundtracks for The Tenth Planet and The Invasion, put together from fan-made recordings, along with a bonus disc, The Origins of the Cybermen, an audio essay by Cyberman actor David Banks, were released on CD in a collector's tin called Doctor Who: Cybermen.

A CD of stock music used in this serial was released in 2000. It was mastered from 1960s vinyl records rather than original archive tapes, resulting in reduced dynamic range with crackle and rumble present throughout. The release contains numerous cues that were not used in the story, and is missing one track that was used.

Track listing

Notes

References

External links

First Doctor serials
Doctor Who missing episodes
Cybermen television stories
1966 British television episodes
Fiction set in 1986
Television episodes set in Antarctica
Doctor Who serials novelised by Gerry Davis
Doctor Who stories set on Earth
Second Doctor serials
Television episodes set in the 1980s
Doctor Who regeneration stories